9th Air Division may refer to:
9th Air Division (Germany), a division of the Luftwaffe
9th Air Division (Japan), a land-based aviation force of the Imperial Japanese Army
9th Anti-Missile Defence Division, of the Russian Space Forces
9th Assault Ropshinskaya Red Banner, Order of Ushakov Air Division, of Soviet Naval Aviation
9th Mixed Air Division, of the Soviet Air Forces (World War II)
9th Air Division, the name of the 9th Space Division of the United States Air Force from 1949 to 1958
9th Air Division, the name of the 19th Air Division of the United States Air Force from May to November 1945